Denys Stanislavovych Kozhanov (born 13 June 1987) is a Ukrainian professional football midfielder who plays for Karpaty Lviv.

Club career
Kozhanov started out his football career at the sports schools No.3 of Mariupol and later the FC Illichivets Mariupol academy. Upon graduation he signed with the regional leader FC Shakhtar Donetsk where for the first couple of years played for its second and third teams in lower leagues.

Karpaty Lviv
In 2007 Kozhanov was lent to Karpaty where he played at first in reserves. On 1 March 2008 he debuted in the Premier League. He became the top assister in the 2009–10 Ukrainian Premier League, giving 13 assists. He played 11 games and scored 2 goals in UEFA Europa League.

Volyn Lutsk
Kozhanov was recognized as the best player of October 2019 in the Ukrainian First League. He became a second player for Volyn to receive such honors. Same season, 2019–20 Ukrainian First League, Kozhanov also became the season's top scorer with 18 goals.

References

External links
 Profile on Official Illichivets Mariupol Website
 
 

1987 births
Living people
People from Hirnyk, Donetsk Oblast
Ukrainian footballers
FC Shakhtar Donetsk players
FC Shakhtar-2 Donetsk players
FC Shakhtar-3 Donetsk players
FC Karpaty Lviv players
FC Mariupol players
FC Sevastopol players
FC Dacia Chișinău players
Ukrainian Premier League players
Ukrainian First League players
Ukrainian Second League players
Association football midfielders
NK Veres Rivne players
FC Volyn Lutsk players
FC Mynai players
Ukrainian expatriate footballers
Expatriate footballers in Moldova
Ukrainian expatriate sportspeople in Moldova
Ukraine international footballers
Sportspeople from Donetsk Oblast